Hankins District No. One Schoolhouse is a historic one-room school located at Hankins in Sullivan County, New York.  It was built about 1845.

It was added to the National Register of Historic Places in 2000.

References

One-room schoolhouses in New York (state)
Schoolhouses in the United States
School buildings on the National Register of Historic Places in New York (state)
School buildings completed in 1845
Buildings and structures in Sullivan County, New York
National Register of Historic Places in Sullivan County, New York